N. Asger Mortensen (born 6 May 1973) is a Danish theoretical physicist who has made contributions to the fields of nanotechnology, including mesoscopic physics, nanofluidics, photonic-crystal fibers, slow light photonic crystals, and plasmonics. He is known for his contributions to understanding nonlocal light-matter interactions at the interface between classical electromagnetism and quantum physics.

Education 
He attended Sorø Academy before enrolling at the Technical University of Denmark where he earned his MSc in Engineering/Applied Physic (1998), his PhD in Theoretical Physics (2001), and his Dr. Techn. (2006), the later being a habilitation degree based on his research conducted in industry. The Dr. Scient. (2021) was awarded by University of Copenhagen.

Career
He was in 2017 called by the University of Southern Denmark (SDU) to become a professor in the SDU Center for Nano Optics, while also holding a D-IAS Chair of Technical Science at the Danish Institute for Advanced Study. Before that he was a professor (faculty since 2004) at the Technical University of Denmark, while also holding prior experience as a research scientist (2001-2004) in industry with Crystal Fibre A/S  (now NKT Photonics). He has been a visiting scientist at the Lorentz Institute at University of Leiden (1998, 2000), the Niels Bohr Institute at University of Copenhagen (1999-2001), and he was an Abbe Guest Professor at the University of Jena (2015). He is currently a VILLUM Investigator supported by the VILLUM Foundation.

References 

1973 births
Living people
Danish physicists
Fellows of Optica (society)
Academic staff of the University of Southern Denmark
Academic staff of the Technical University of Denmark
Fellows of SPIE
Fellows of the American Physical Society
Technical University of Denmark alumni
Fellows of the Institute of Physics